Aeroflot Flight 343 ( Reys 343 Aeroflota) was a passenger flight from Moscow-Sheremetyevo Airport to Jorge Chávez International Airport, on a stopover at Luxembourg-Findel International Airport, that veered off the runway on 29 September 1982, fatally injuring seven occupants. The Ilyushin Il-62M operating the flight suffered a mechanical failure.

Aircraft 
The aircraft involved in the accident was an Ilyushin Il-62M operated by Aeroflot, registered CCCP-86470.  The aircraft rolled off the assembly line of the Kazan production facility in April 1977.  At the time of the accident, the aircraft had 10,325 flight hours.

Accident description 
The flight was intended for the Moscow-Luxembourg-Havana-Lima route, but crashed on the first stopover in Luxembourg. The flight had 66 passengers and 11 crew members. The aircraft started experiencing technical difficulties on approach to landing. Instead of stopping on the runway, the aircraft wing hit a water tower, then continued on, striking a small airport fence before it rolled into a small forest, damaged several trees, then fell into a small ravine 200 meters from the runway at 20:23 local time.

Causes 
The investigation determined the probable cause of the accident to be mechanical failure of the thrust reversers on engine No.1:

References

Aviation accidents and incidents in 1982
Aviation accidents and incidents in Luxembourg
343
1982 in the Soviet Union
Accidents and incidents involving the Ilyushin Il-62
Airliner accidents and incidents caused by mechanical failure
September 1982 events in Europe
1982 in Luxembourg